NAEA or Naea may stand for:

Organisations
National Association of Estate Agents, United Kingdom
National Art Education Association, United States
National Association of Enrolled Agents, United States, an association of tax advisors
NAEA Energy Massachusetts LLC, associated with the West Springfield Generating Station, Massachusetts, United States

People
Asomua Naea (born 1969), Samoan boxer
George Naea (died 1854), high chief of the Kingdom of Hawaii
Naea Bennett (born 1977), Tahitian footballer